Huggle may refer to:
 Huggle, Sweden, a very small medieval village in Heby, Uppsala, Sweden
 Huggle (app)
 Mr. Huggles, a W.I.T.C.H character
 Bunny Huggles, a Hi Hi Puffy AmiYumi character
 The Huggles, a character on The Great Space Coaster